Birtara Union is a union parishad of Dhanbari Upazila, Tangail District, Bangladesh. It is situated 66 km north of Tangail.
Birtara Union Code - 1238.

Gallery

Demographics

According to Population Census 2011 performed by Bangladesh Bureau of Statistics, The total population of Birtara union is 18481. There are 4849 households in total.

Education
There are two secondary schools in the union: Bajitpur Amir Hossain High School and Kendua High School.

The literacy rate of Birtara Union is 39.9% (Male-42.7%, Female-37.3%).

See also
 Rajarhat
 Bajitpur
 Union Councils of Tangail District

References

Populated places in Dhaka Division
Populated places in Tangail District
Unions of Dhanbari Upazila